Kentrochrysalis heberti is a species of moth of the  family Sphingidae. It is known from central China.

References

Sphingulini
Moths described in 2010